Hope Point may refer to:

Hope Point (Antarctica)
Hope Point (South Georgia)